Anthoxanthum (Latinised Greek for "yellow blossom"), commonly known as hornworts, vernal grasses, or vernalgrasses, is a genus of plants in the grass family. The  generic name means 'Yellow flower' in Botanical Latin, referring to the colour of the mature spikelets.

The members of Anthoxanthum are widespread in temperate and subtropical parts of Africa and Eurasia, with a few species in tropical mountains. Some species have become naturalized in Australia, New Zealand, and the Americas. Anthoxanthum odoratum is a common species of acidic grassland and bogs in northern Europe. All the species reportedly contain the compound coumarin, used medicinally in many countries.

The genus Hierochloe is included in Anthoxanthum by some recent authors. Others, however, continue to treat them as separate genera, and we provisionally treat them as such here pending further research.

 Species
 Anthoxanthum aethiopicum - Ethiopia
 Anthoxanthum amarum - Spain, Portugal
 Anthoxanthum aristatum - Mediterranean and neighboring areas from Madeira and the Canary Islands to the Aegean
 Anthoxanthum borii - India
 Anthoxanthum dregeanum - Cape Province of South Africa
 Anthoxanthum ecklonii- South Africa, Lesotho, Malawi
 Anthoxanthum gracile - Mediterranean from Morocco to the Aegean
 Anthoxanthum hookeri - Guizhou, Sichuan, Tibet, Yunnan, Bhutan, Nepal, Sikkim, Assam, Arunachal Pradesh, Myanmar
 Anthoxanthum horsfieldii - Southeast Asia, New Guinea, Assam, Taiwan, Guizhou
 Anthoxanthum japonicum - Honshu
 Anthoxanthum madagascariense - Madagascar
 Anthoxanthum nivale - mountains of central Africa (Zaïre, Rwanda, Uganda, Kenya, Tanzania)
 Anthoxanthum odoratum - widespread from Iceland to the Canary Islands to Mongolia; naturalized in North and South America, South Africa, Japan, East Asia, and various islands
 Anthoxanthum ovatum - Mediterranean from Spain to the Aegean
 Anthoxanthum pallidum - Sichuan, Yunnan
 Anthoxanthum sikkimense - Nepal, Yunnan, Sikkim, Bhutan, Arunachal Pradesh
 Anthoxanthum tongo - Cape Province of South Africa

 formerly included
numerous species now considered better suited to other genera. Most important is Hierochloe; others include Centotheca Crypsis Dichelachne Dimeria Festuca Perotis Saccharum

See also
 List of Poaceae genera

References

Pooideae
Poaceae genera
Taxa named by Carl Linnaeus